Barbier is a French surname. Notable people with the surname include:

 Antoine Alexandre Barbier (1765–1825), French librarian
 Carl Barbier (born 1944), U.S. Federal Judge, Eastern District of Louisiana
 Charles Barbier (1767–1841), French inventor of alternative writing methods
 Charles Barbier de Meynard (1826–1908), French historian and orientalist
 Christophe Barbier (born 1967), French journalist
 Edmond Jean François Barbier (1689–1771), French jurisconsult
 Darren Barbier (born 1960), American college football coach
 Gabriel Barbier-Mueller, Swiss CEO of Harwood International
 George Barbier (illustrator) (1882–1932), French illustrator
 George Barbier (actor) (1864–1945), American actor
 Henri Auguste Barbier (1805–1882), French dramatist and poet
 Jean-François Barbier (1754–1828), French general during the French Revolutionary Wars and Napoleonic Wars
 Joseph-Émile Barbier (1839–1889), French astronomer and mathematician
 Leonid Barbier (born 1937), Soviet swimmer
 Louis Barbier (1593–1670), French bishop
 Philippe Barbier (1848–1922), French organic chemist
 Pierre Barbier (born 1997), French racing cyclist
 René Barbier (1891–1966), French fencer
 Rudy Barbier (born 1992), French racing cyclist
Sal Barbier (born 1969), American skateboarder and footwear designer

Occupational surnames
French-language surnames